Jamaica Beach is a city in Galveston County, Texas,  United States on Galveston Island. As of the 2010 census, the city's population was 983. the city is bordered by Galveston to the east and west, the east bay on the north and the Gulf of Mexico to the south.

History

Prior to its development, Jamaica Beach was a burial ground of the Karankawa people. Johnny Goyen and Earl Galceran of the Jamaica Corporation developed Jamaica Beach as a 2,000-lot resort subdivision in close proximity to a marina. The individuals who were a part of the development effort were Goyen, Galceran, brothers Jack and Welcome Wilson, Bill Sherrill, and Jack Valenti. They acquired an area of  that was owned by the Moody family. An oil businessperson named R.E. "Bob" Smith decided not to be a partner in the development, but he purchased the Moody land and sold it to the developers. He did not ask for any down payments and he guaranteed a $250,000 bank loan. Initially, the beachfront lots, each , were sold for $3,500 apiece. The "second row" houses sold at a quick pace. As the subsequent rows of houses opened to sale, the sales figures decreased slowly because while wealthy people were easily able to acquire second houses, middle class homebuyers were unable to get a mortgage, and needed to pay for the homebuilding with cash.

In the 1960s, the discovery of a skull and that it was connected to a Karankawa Native American burial ground led to an increase in public exposure and visitors. Welcome Wilson said that no additional sales were generated by the publicity. With the growth of the second house market, almost all of the lots on Jamaica Beach had been sold by the 1970s. Due to a decline in the United States economy, the developer closed its doors. The city incorporated on May 12, 1975. By 1978, 141 residents lived in Jamaica Beach. By 1988, the city had 446 residents and no businesses. By 1990, the city had 624 residents.

Jamaica Beach was affected by Hurricane Alicia in August 1983. In September 2008, the city was affected by Hurricane Ike.

On Saturday August 9, 2008, Jamaica Beach celebrated the 50th anniversary of its groundbreaking. At the ceremony, Welcome Wilson donated boxes of news articles, brochures, and promotional materials in order to build a collection for a museum located at the city hall. In addition, the five children of Welcome Wilson donated $10,000 to the new museum.

Geography

Jamaica Beach is located at  (29.192080, –94.980488).

The city has several pirate-themed street names. They include "Blackbeard", "Buccaneer", "Captain Hook", "Captain Kidd". "Francis Drake", "John Davis", "Jean Lafitte", "Mansvelt", "Henry Morgan", "John Silver", and "Edward Teach".

Parks
Galveston Island State Park

Demographics

2020 Census data

As of the 2020 United States census, there were 1,078 people, 704 households, and 339 families residing in the city.

2000 Census data
As of the census of 2000, there were 1,075 people, 483 households, and 303 families residing in the city. The population density was 1,487.7 people per square mile (576.5/km). There were 1,078 housing units at an average density of 1,491.8 per square mile (578.1/km). The racial makeup of the city was 95.07% White, 0.37% African American, 0.37% Native American, 0.56% Asian, 1.95% from other races, and 1.67% from two or more races. Hispanic or Latino of any race were 8.56% of the population.

There were 483 households, out of which 25.7% had children under the age of 18 living with them, 52.8% were married couples living together, 6.8% had a female householder with no husband present, and 37.1% were non-families. 27.3% of all households were made up of individuals, and 7.7% had someone living alone who was 65 years of age or older. The average household size was 2.23 and the average family size was 2.74.

In the city, the population was 20.3% under the age of 18, 4.9% from 18 to 24, 31.9% from 25 to 44, 28.4% from 45 to 64, and 14.5% who were 65 years of age or older. The median age was 42 years. For every 100 females, there were 99.8 males. For every 100 females age 18 and over, there were 99.8 males. The median income for a household in the city was $52,045, and the median income for a family was $66,250. Males had a median income of $42,411 versus $31,875 for females. The per capita income for the city was $30,943. About 5.7% of families and 7.3% of the population were below the poverty line, including 8.4% of those under age 18 and none of those age 65 or over.

Government and infrastructure

As of 2008 the City Council includes Mayor Victor Pierson, Mayor Pro Tem Steve Spicer, and four aldermen (Brad South, Eddie Burke, Sherwood Green, and Mary Morse). The city council established the Jamaica Beach Police Department in 1978; as of 2008 the department has one chief, one lieutenant, and five police officers. Jamaica Beach contracted its dispatching to the City of Hitchcock. After a large brush fire, the city created the Jamaica Beach Volunteer Fire Department and EMS in 1976. The city also has a municipal court, a water and sewer department, and a building department.

In November 2007 a United States Postal Service Contract Postal Unit opened inside a local business in Jamaica Beach. The West Galveston Contract Unit (77554-9998) is at Bob Smith Drive near Farm to Market Road 3005.

Education 

Pupils in Jamaica Beach are within the Galveston Independent School District.  there are no particular attendance boundaries in GISD so parents may apply to any school they wish. Ball High School (9–12) in Galveston is the district's sole comprehensive high school.

Previously students are zoned to Oppe Elementary School (K–4) and Weis Middle School (6–8).

Galveston ISD (and therefore Jamaica Beach) is assigned to Galveston College in Galveston.

Texas A&M University at Galveston is in nearby Galveston.

References

External links

 City of Jamaica Beach official website

Cities in Texas
Cities in Galveston County, Texas
Greater Houston
Populated coastal places in Texas